Guptipara High School is one of the oldest school of Hooghly district. It was established in 1890 in Guptipara, Indian state of West Bengal.

Category
This is Upper Primary with Secondary/Higher Secondary school managed by the School Education Department, West Bengal. The secondary section (V - X) of Guptipara High School is for boys and XI - XII section is co-education which provides Arts, Science and Commerce streams. The school is affiliated to the West Bengal Board of Secondary Education (for the Secondary Education) and to the WBCHSE for Higher Secondary.

See also
Education in India
List of schools in India
Education in West Bengal

References

External links 

Boys' schools in India
High schools and secondary schools in West Bengal
Schools in Hooghly district
Educational institutions established in 1890
1890 establishments in India